The Napanee River is a river in Lennox and Addington County and Frontenac County in Eastern Ontario, Canada. It is in the Great Lakes Basin and flows from its source at Camden Lake to its mouth at the Bay of Quinte on Lake Ontario at Napanee. It flows through a valley of preglacial origin. The valley of the Napanee is lined with settlements such as Greater Napanee, Newburgh, Camden East, Yarker, and Petworth.

This river was originally called the Appanea. A grist mill was constructed on the river in 1785 near the current site of the town of Greater Napanee. Other mills were added at Yarker and Camden East.

Tributaries
Varty Creek (right)
Napanee Lake
Watson Creek (left)
Hardwood Creek (left)
Depot Creek (left)
Whitman Creek (left)
Carman Creek (left)

See also
List of Ontario rivers

References

Sources

Rivers of Frontenac County
Rivers of Lennox and Addington County
Tributaries of Lake Ontario